In  medicine and allied fields, diathesis (from Greek διάθεσις) is a hereditary or constitutional predisposition to a group of diseases, an allergy, or other disorder. There are many types of diathesis. Some including strumous diathesis, sthenic diathesis, and many more.

Atopic diathesis is a predisposition to develop one or more of hay fever, allergic rhinitis, bronchial asthma, or atopic dermatitis.

Types 

 Lupus diathesis
 Strumous diathesis
 Sthenic diathesis

See also
Bleeding diathesis
Diathesis–stress model

References

External links

Medical terminology